Puerto Rico (abbreviated PR; , Borinquen), officially the Commonwealth of Puerto Rico, is a Caribbean island and unincorporated territory of the United States with official Commonwealth status. It has roughly 3.2 million residents, and its capital and most populous city is San Juan. Spanish and English are the official languages of the executive branch of government, though Spanish predominates.

Puerto Rico was settled by a succession of indigenous peoples beginning 2,000 to 4,000 years ago; these included the Ortoiroid, Saladoid, and Taíno. It was then colonized by Spain following the arrival of Christopher Columbus in 1493. Puerto Rico was contested by other European powers, but remained a Spanish possession for the next four centuries. An influx of African slaves and settlers primarily from the Canary Islands and Andalusia vastly changed the cultural and demographic landscape of the island. Within the Spanish Empire, Puerto Rico played a secondary but strategic role compared to wealthier colonies like Peru and New Spain. By the late 19th century, a distinct Puerto Rican identity began to emerge, centered around a fusion of indigenous, African, and European elements. In 1898, following the Spanish–American War, Puerto Rico was acquired by the United States.

Puerto Ricans have been U.S. citizens since 1917, and can move freely between the island and the mainland. However, as residents of an unincorporated territory, American citizens of Puerto Rico are disenfranchised at the national level, do not vote for the president or vice president, and generally do not pay federal income tax. In common with four other territories, Puerto Rico sends a nonvoting representative to the U.S. Congress, called a Resident Commissioner, and participates in presidential primaries; as it is not a state, Puerto Rico does not have a vote in Congress, which governs it under the Puerto Rico Federal Relations Act of 1950. Congress approved a local constitution in 1952, allowing U.S. citizens residing on the island to elect a governor. Puerto Rico's current and future political status has consistently been a matter of significant debate.

Beginning in the mid-20th century, the U.S. government, together with the Puerto Rico Industrial Development Company, launched a series of economic projects to develop Puerto Rico into an industrial high-income economy. It is classified by the International Monetary Fund as a developed jurisdiction with an advanced, high-income economy; it ranks 40th on the Human Development Index. The major sectors of Puerto Rico's economy are manufacturing (primarily pharmaceuticals, petrochemicals, and electronics) followed by services (namely tourism and hospitality).

Etymology
Puerto Rico is Spanish for "rich port".

Columbus named the island , in honor of Saint John the Baptist, while the capital city was named  ("Rich Port City"). Eventually traders and other maritime visitors came to refer to the entire island as Puerto Rico, while San Juan became the name used for the main trading/shipping port and the capital city.

The island's name was changed to Porto Rico by the United States after the Treaty of Paris of 1898. The anglicized name was used by the U.S. government and private enterprises. The name was changed back to Puerto Rico in 1931 by a joint resolution in Congress introduced by Félix Córdova Dávila.

History

Pre-Columbian era

The ancient history of the archipelago which is now Puerto Rico is not well known. Unlike other indigenous cultures in the New World (Aztec, Maya or Inca) which left behind abundant archeological and physical evidence of their societies, scant artifacts and evidence remain of the Puerto Rico's earliest population. Scarce archaeological findings and early Spanish accounts from the colonial era constitute all that is known about them. The first comprehensive book on the history of Puerto Rico was written by Fray Íñigo Abbad y Lasierra in 1786, nearly three centuries after the first Spaniards landed on the island.

The first known settlers were the Ortoiroid people, an Archaic Period culture of Amerindian hunters and fishermen who migrated from the South American mainland. Some scholars suggest their settlement dates back about 4,000 years. An archeological dig in 1990 on the island of Vieques found the remains of a man, designated as the "Puerto Ferro Man", which was dated to around 2000 BC. The Ortoiroid were displaced by the Saladoid, a culture from the same region that arrived on the island between 430 and 250 BCE.

The Igneri tribe migrated to Puerto Rico between 120 and 400 AD from the region of the Orinoco river in northern South America. The Arcaico and Igneri co-existed on the island between the 4th and 10th centuries.

Between the 7th and 11th centuries, the Taíno culture developed on the island. By approximately 1000 AD, it had become dominant. At the time of Columbus' arrival, an estimated 30,000 to 60,000 Taíno Amerindians, led by the cacique (chief) Agüeybaná, inhabited the island. They called it Boriken, meaning "the great land of the valiant and noble Lord". The natives lived in small villages, each led by a cacique. They subsisted by hunting and fishing, done generally by men, as well as by the women's gathering and processing of indigenous cassava root and fruit. This lasted until Columbus arrived in 1493.

Spanish colony (1493–1898)

Conquest and early settlement
When Columbus arrived in Puerto Rico during his second voyage on 19 November 1493, the island was inhabited by the Taíno. They called it Borikén, spelled in a variety of ways by different writers of the day. Columbus named the island San Juan Bautista, in honor of St John the Baptist. Having reported the findings of his first travel, Columbus brought with him this time a letter from King Ferdinand empowered by a papal bull that authorized any course of action necessary for the expansion of the Spanish Empire and the Christian faith. Juan Ponce de León, a lieutenant under Columbus, founded the first Spanish settlement, Caparra, on 8 August 1508. He later served as the first governor of the island. Eventually, traders and other maritime visitors came to refer to the entire island as Puerto Rico, and San Juan became the name of the main trading/shipping port.

At the beginning of the 16th century, the Spanish people began to colonize the island. Despite the Laws of Burgos of 1512 and other decrees for the protection of the indigenous population, some Taíno Indians were forced into an encomienda system of forced labor in the early years of colonization. The population suffered extremely high fatalities from epidemics of European infectious diseases.

Colonization under the Habsburgs
In 1520, King Charles I of Spain issued a royal decree collectively emancipating the remaining Taíno population. By that time, the Taíno people were few in number. Enslaved Africans had already begun to be imported to compensate for the native labor loss, but their numbers were proportionate to the diminished commercial interest Spain soon began to demonstrate for the island colony. Other nearby islands, like Cuba, Hispaniola, and Guadalupe, attracted more of the slave trade than Puerto Rico, probably because of greater agricultural interests in those islands, on which colonists had developed large sugar plantations and had the capital to invest in the Atlantic slave trade.

From the beginning of the country, the colonial administration relied heavily on the industry of enslaved Africans and creole blacks for public works and defenses, primarily in coastal ports and cities, where the tiny colonial population had hunkered down. With no significant industries or large-scale agricultural production as yet, enslaved and free communities lodged around the few littoral settlements, particularly around San Juan, also forming lasting Afro-creole communities. Meanwhile, in the island's interior, there developed a mixed and independent peasantry that relied on a subsistence economy. This mostly unsupervised population supplied villages and settlements with foodstuffs and, in relative isolation, set the pattern for what later would be known as the Puerto Rican Jíbaro culture. By the end of the 16th century, the Spanish Empire was diminishing and, in the face of increasing raids from European competitors, the colonial administration throughout the Americas fell into a "bunker mentality". Imperial strategists and urban planners redesigned port settlements into military posts with the objective of protecting Spanish territorial claims and ensuring the safe passing of the king's silver-laden Atlantic Fleet to the Iberian Peninsula. San Juan served as an important port-of-call for ships driven across the Atlantic by its powerful trade winds. West Indies convoys linked Spain to the island, sailing between Cádiz and the Spanish West Indies. The colony's seat of government was on the forested Islet of San Juan and for a time became one of the most heavily fortified settlements in the Spanish Caribbean earning the name of the "Walled City". The islet is still dotted with the various forts and walls, such as La Fortaleza, Castillo San Felipe del Morro, and Castillo San Cristóbal, designed to protect the population and the strategic Port of San Juan from the raids of the Spanish European competitors.

In 1625, in the Battle of San Juan, the Dutch commander Boudewijn Hendricksz tested the defenses' limits like no one else before. Learning from Francis Drake's previous failures here, he circumvented the cannons of the castle of San Felipe del Morro and quickly brought his 17 ships into the San Juan Bay. He then occupied the port and attacked the city while the population hurried for shelter behind El Morro's moat and high battlements. Historians consider this event the worst attack on San Juan. Though the Dutch set the village on fire, they failed to conquer El Morro, and its batteries pounded their troops and ships until Hendricksz deemed the cause lost. Hendricksz's expedition eventually helped propel a fortification frenzy. Constructions of defenses for the San Cristóbal Hill were soon ordered so as to prevent the landing of invaders out of reach of El Morro's artillery. Urban planning responded to the needs of keeping the colony in Spanish hands.

Late colonial period

During the late 16th and early 17th centuries, Spain concentrated its colonial efforts on the more prosperous mainland North, Central, and South American colonies. With the advent of the lively Bourbon Dynasty in Spain in the 1700s, the island of Puerto Rico began a gradual shift to more imperial attention. More roads began connecting previously isolated inland settlements to coastal cities, and coastal settlements like Arecibo, Mayaguez, and Ponce began acquiring importance of their own, separate from San Juan. By the end of the 18th century, merchant ships from an array of nationalities threatened the tight regulations of the Mercantilist system, which turned each colony solely toward the European metropole and limited contact with other nations. U.S. ships came to surpass Spanish trade and with this also came the exploitation of the island's natural resources. Slavers, which had made but few stops on the island before, began selling more enslaved Africans to growing sugar and coffee plantations. The increasing number of Atlantic wars in which the Caribbean islands played major roles, like the War of Jenkins' Ear, the Seven Years' War and the Atlantic Revolutions, ensured Puerto Rico's growing esteem in Madrid's eyes. On 17 April 1797, Sir Ralph Abercromby's fleet invaded the island with a force of 6,000–13,000 men, which included German soldiers and Royal Marines and 60 to 64 ships. Fierce fighting continued for the next days with Spanish troops. Both sides suffered heavy losses. On Sunday 30 April the British ceased their attack and began their retreat from San Juan. By the time independence movements in the larger Spanish colonies gained success, new waves of loyal creole immigrants began to arrive in Puerto Rico, helping to tilt the island's political balance toward the Crown.

In 1809, to secure its political bond with the island and in the midst of the European Peninsular War, the Supreme Central Junta based in Cádiz recognized Puerto Rico as an overseas province of Spain. This gave the island residents the right to elect representatives to the recently convened Cortes of Cádiz (effectively the Spanish government during a portion of the Napoleonic Wars), with equal representation to mainland Iberian, Mediterranean (Balearic Islands) and Atlantic maritime Spanish provinces (Canary Islands).

Ramón Power y Giralt, the first Spanish parliamentary representative from the island of Puerto Rico, died after serving a three-year term in the Cortes. These parliamentary and constitutional reforms were in force from 1810 to 1814, and again from 1820 to 1823. They were twice reversed during the restoration of the traditional monarchy by Ferdinand VII. Immigration and commercial trade reforms in the 19th century increased the island's ethnic European population and economy and expanded the Spanish cultural and social imprint on the local character of the island.

Minor slave revolts had occurred on the island throughout the years, with the revolt planned and organized by Marcos Xiorro in 1821 being the most important. Even though the conspiracy was unsuccessful, Xiorro achieved legendary status and is part of Puerto Rico's folklore.

Politics of liberalism

In the early 19th century, Puerto Rico spawned an independence movement that, due to harsh persecution by the Spanish authorities, convened in the island of St. Thomas. The movement was largely inspired by the ideals of Simón Bolívar in establishing a United Provinces of New Granada and Venezuela, that included Puerto Rico and Cuba. Among the influential members of this movement were Brigadier General Antonio Valero de Bernabé and María de las Mercedes Barbudo. The movement was discovered, and Governor Miguel de la Torre had its members imprisoned or exiled.

With the increasingly rapid growth of independent former Spanish colonies in the South and Central American states in the first part of the 19th century, the Spanish Crown considered Puerto Rico and Cuba of strategic importance. To increase its hold on its last two New World colonies, the Spanish Crown revived the Royal Decree of Graces of 1815 as a result of which 450,000 immigrants, mainly Spaniards, settled on the island in the period up until the American conquest. Printed in three languages—Spanish, English, and French—it was intended to also attract non-Spanish Europeans, with the hope that the independence movements would lose their popularity if new settlers had stronger ties to the Crown. Hundreds of non-Spanish families, mainly from Corsica, France, Germany, Ireland, Italy and Scotland, also immigrated to the island.

Free land was offered as an incentive to those who wanted to populate the two islands, on the condition that they swear their loyalty to the Spanish Crown and allegiance to the Roman Catholic Church. The offer was very successful, and European immigration continued even after 1898. Puerto Rico still receives Spanish and European immigration.

Poverty and political estrangement with Spain led to a small but significant uprising in 1868 known as Grito de Lares. It began in the rural town of Lares, but was subdued when rebels moved to the neighboring town of San Sebastián.

Leaders of this independence movement included Ramón Emeterio Betances, considered the "father" of the Puerto Rican independence movement, and other political figures such as Segundo Ruiz Belvis. Slavery was abolished in Puerto Rico in 1873, "with provisions for periods of apprenticeship".

Leaders of "El Grito de Lares" went into exile in New York City. Many joined the Puerto Rican Revolutionary Committee, founded on 8 December 1895, and continued their quest for Puerto Rican independence. In 1897, Antonio Mattei Lluberas and the local leaders of the independence movement in Yauco organized another uprising, which became known as the Intentona de Yauco. They raised what they called the Puerto Rican flag, which was adopted as the national flag. The local conservative political factions opposed independence. Rumors of the planned event spread to the local Spanish authorities who acted swiftly and put an end to what would be the last major uprising in the island to Spanish colonial rule.

In 1897, Luis Muñoz Rivera and others persuaded the liberal Spanish government to agree to grant limited self-government to the island by royal decree in the Autonomic Charter, including a bicameral legislature. In 1898, Puerto Rico's first, but short-lived, autonomous government was organized as an "overseas province" of Spain. This bilaterally agreed-upon charter maintained a governor appointed by the King of Spain—who held the power to annul any legislative decision—and a partially elected parliamentary structure. In February, Governor-General Manuel Macías inaugurated the new government under the Autonomic Charter. General elections were held in March and the new government began to function on 17 July 1898.

Spanish–American War

In 1890, Captain Alfred Thayer Mahan, a member of the Navy War Board and leading U.S. strategic thinker, published a book titled The Influence of Sea Power upon History in which he argued for the establishment of a large and powerful navy modeled after the British Royal Navy. Part of his strategy called for the acquisition of colonies in the Caribbean, which would serve as coaling and naval stations. They would serve as strategic points of defense with the construction of a canal through the Isthmus of Panama, to allow easier passage of ships between the Atlantic and Pacific oceans.

William H. Seward, the Secretary of State under presidents Abraham Lincoln and Andrew Johnson, had also stressed the importance of building a canal in Honduras, Nicaragua or Panama. He suggested that the United States annex the Dominican Republic and purchase Puerto Rico and Cuba. The U.S. Senate did not approve his annexation proposal, and Spain rejected the U.S. offer of  dollars for Puerto Rico and Cuba.

Since 1894, the United States Naval War College had been developing contingency plans for a war with Spain. By 1896, the U.S. Office of Naval Intelligence had prepared a plan that included military operations in Puerto Rican waters. Plans generally centered on attacks on Spanish territories were intended as support operations against Spain's forces in and around Cuba. Recent research suggests that the U.S. did consider Puerto Rico valuable as a naval station, and recognized that it and Cuba generated lucrative crops of sugar, a valuable commercial commodity which the United States lacked prior to the development of the sugar beet industry in the United States.

On 25 July 1898, during the Spanish–American War, the U.S. invaded Puerto Rico with a landing at Guánica. After the U.S. prevailed in the war, Spain ceded Puerto Rico, along with the Philippines and Guam, to the U.S. under the Treaty of Paris, which went into effect on 11 April 1899; Spain relinquished sovereignty over Cuba, but did not cede it to the U.S.

American territory (1898–present)

U.S. unincorporated organized territory
The United States and Puerto Rico began a long-standing metropolis-colony relationship. This relationship has been documented by numerous scholars, including U.S. Federal Appeals Judge Juan Torruella, U.S. Congresswoman Nydia Velázquez, Chief Justice of the Puerto Rico Supreme Court José Trías Monge, and former Albizu University president Ángel Collado-Schwarz.

In the early 20th century, Puerto Rico was ruled by the U.S. military, with officials including the governor appointed by the president of the United States. The Foraker Act of 1900 gave Puerto Rico a certain amount of civilian popular government, including a popularly elected House of Representatives. The upper house and governor were appointed by the United States.

Its judicial system was reformed to bring it into conformity with the American federal courts system; a Puerto Rico Supreme Court and a United States District Court for the unincorporated territory were established. It was authorized a nonvoting member of Congress, by the title of "Resident Commissioner", who was appointed. In addition, this Act extended all U.S. laws "not locally inapplicable" to Puerto Rico, specifying, in particular, exemption from U.S. Internal Revenue laws.

The Act empowered the civil government to legislate on "all matters of legislative character not locally inapplicable", including the power to modify and repeal any laws then in existence in Puerto Rico, though the U.S. Congress retained the power to annul acts of the Puerto Rico legislature. During an address to the Puerto Rican legislature in 1906, President Theodore Roosevelt recommended that Puerto Ricans become U.S. citizens.

In 1914, the Puerto Rican House of Delegates voted unanimously in favor of independence from the United States, but this was rejected by the U.S. Congress as "unconstitutional", and in violation of the 1900 Foraker Act.

U.S. citizenship and Puerto Rican citizenship

In 1917, the U.S. Congress passed the Jones–Shafroth Act (popularly known as the Jones Act), which granted Puerto Ricans born on or after 25 April 1898 U.S. citizenship. Opponents, including all the Puerto Rican House of Delegates (who voted unanimously against it), claimed the U.S. imposed citizenship to draft Puerto Rican men for America's entry into World War I the same year.

The Jones Act also provided for a popularly elected Senate to complete a bicameral Legislative Assembly, as well as a bill of rights. It authorized the popular election of the Resident Commissioner to a four-year term.

Natural disasters, including a major earthquake and tsunami in 1918 and several hurricanes, as well as the Great Depression, impoverished the island during the first few decades under U.S. rule. Some political leaders, such as Pedro Albizu Campos, who led the Puerto Rican Nationalist Party, demanded a change in relations with the United States. He organized a protest at the University of Puerto Rico in 1935, in which four were killed by police.

In 1936, U.S. senator Millard Tydings introduced a bill supporting independence for Puerto Rico; he had previously co-sponsored the Tydings–McDuffie Act, which provided independence to the Philippines following a 10-year transition period of limited autonomy. While virtually all Puerto Rican political parties supported the bill, it was opposed by Luis Muñoz Marín of the Liberal Party of Puerto Rico, leading to its defeat

In 1937, Albizu Campos' party organized a protest in Ponce. The Insular Police, similar to the National Guard, opened fire upon unarmed cadets and bystanders alike. The attack on unarmed protesters was reported by U.S. Congressman Vito Marcantonio and confirmed by a report from the Hays Commission, which investigated the events, led by Arthur Garfield Hays, counsel to the American Civil Liberties Union. Nineteen people were killed and over 200 were badly wounded, many shot in the back while running away. The Hays Commission declared it a massacre and police mob action, and it has since become known as the Ponce massacre. In the aftermath, on 2 April 1943, Tydings introduced another bill in Congress calling for independence for Puerto Rico, though it was again defeated.

During the latter years of the Roosevelt–Truman administrations, the internal governance of the island was changed in a compromise reached with Luis Muñoz Marín and other Puerto Rican leaders. In 1946, President Truman appointed the first Puerto Rican-born governor, Jesús T. Piñero.

Since 2007, the Puerto Rico State Department has developed a protocol to issue certificates of Puerto Rican citizenship to Puerto Ricans. In order to be eligible, applicants must have been born in Puerto Rico, born outside of Puerto Rico to a Puerto Rican-born parent, or be an American citizen with at least one year of residence in Puerto Rico.

U.S. unincorporated organized territory with commonwealth constitution
In 1947, the U.S. Congress passed the Elective Governor Act, signed by President Truman, allowing Puerto Ricans to vote for their own governor. The first elections under this act were held the following year, on 2 November 1948.

On 21 May 1948, a bill was introduced before the Puerto Rican Senate which would restrain the rights of the independence and Nationalist movements on the island. The Senate, controlled by the Partido Popular Democrático (PPD) and presided by Luis Muñoz Marín, approved the bill that day. This bill, which resembled the anti-communist Smith Act passed in the United States in 1940, became known as the Ley de la Mordaza (Gag Law) when the U.S.-appointed governor of Puerto Rico, Jesús T. Piñero, signed it into law on 10 June 1948.

Under this new law, it would be a crime to print, publish, sell, or exhibit any material intended to paralyze or destroy the insular government; or to organize any society, group or assembly of people with a similar destructive intent. It made it illegal to sing a patriotic song, and reinforced the 1898 law that had made it illegal to display the flag of Puerto Rico, with anyone found guilty of disobeying the law in any way being subject to a sentence of up to ten years imprisonment, a fine of up to US$10,000, or both.

According to Dr. Leopoldo Figueroa, the only non-PPD member of the Puerto Rico House of Representatives, the law was repressive and in violation of the First Amendment of the U.S. Constitution, which guarantees Freedom of Speech. He asserted that the law as such was a violation of the civil rights of the people of Puerto Rico. The law was repealed in 1957.

In the November 1948 election, Muñoz Marín became the first popularly elected governor of Puerto Rico, replacing U.S.-appointed Piñero on 2 January 1949.

Estado Libre Asociado

In 1950, the U.S. Congress granted Puerto Ricans the right to organize a constitutional convention via a referendum; voters could either accept or reject a proposed U.S. law that would organize Puerto Rico as a "commonwealth" under continued U.S. sovereignty. The Constitution of Puerto Rico was approved by the constitutional convention on 6 February 1952, and by 82% of voters in a March referendum. It was modified and ratified by the U.S. Congress, approved by President Truman on 3 July of that year, and proclaimed by Governor Muñoz Marín on 25 July 1952—the anniversary of the landing of U.S. troops in the Puerto Rican Campaign of the Spanish–American War, until then celebrated as an annual Puerto Rico holiday.

Puerto Rico adopted the name of Estado Libre Asociado de Puerto Rico (literally "Associated Free State of Puerto Rico"), officially translated into English as Commonwealth, for its body politic. Congress would continue governing fundamental aspects of Puerto Rican society, including citizenship, currency, the postal service, foreign policy, military defense, commerce and finance, and other matters.

In 1967 Puerto Rico's Legislative Assembly polled the political preferences of the Puerto Rican electorate by passing a plebiscite act that provided for a vote on the status of Puerto Rico. This constituted the first plebiscite by the Legislature for a choice among three status options (commonwealth, statehood, and independence). In subsequent plebiscites organized by Puerto Rico held in 1993 and 1998 (without any formal commitment on the part of the U.S. government to honor the results), the current political status failed to receive majority support. In 1993, Commonwealth status won by a plurality of votes (48.6% versus 46.3% for statehood), while the "none of the above" option, which was the Popular Democratic Party-sponsored choice, won in 1998 with 50.3% of the votes (versus 46.5% for statehood). Disputes arose as to the definition of each of the ballot alternatives, and Commonwealth advocates, among others, reportedly urged a vote for "none of the above".

In 1950, the U.S. Congress approved Public Law 600 (P.L. 81-600), which allowed for a democratic referendum in Puerto Rico to determine whether Puerto Ricans desired to draft their own local constitution. This Act was meant to be adopted in the "nature of a compact". It required congressional approval of the Puerto Rico Constitution before it could go into effect, and repealed certain sections of the Organic Act of 1917. The sections of this statute left in force were entitled the Puerto Rican Federal Relations Act. U.S. Secretary of the Interior Oscar L. Chapman, under whose Department resided responsibility of Puerto Rican affairs, clarified the new commonwealth status in this manner:

On 30 October 1950, Pedro Albizu Campos and other nationalists led a three-day revolt against the United States in various cities and towns of Puerto Rico, in what is known as the Puerto Rican Nationalist Party Revolts of the 1950s. The most notable occurred in Jayuya and Utuado. In the Jayuya revolt, known as the "Jayuya Uprising", the Puerto Rican governor declared martial law, and attacked the insurgents in Jayuya with infantry, artillery and bombers under control of the Puerto Rican commander. The "Utuado Uprising" culminated in what is known as the Utuado massacre. Albizu Campos served many years in a federal prison in Atlanta, for seditious conspiracy to overthrow the U.S. government in Puerto Rico.

On 1 November 1950, Puerto Rican nationalists from New York City, Griselio Torresola and Oscar Collazo, attempted to assassinate President Harry S. Truman at his temporary residence of Blair House. Torresola was killed during the attack, but Collazo was wounded and captured. He was convicted of murder and sentenced to death, but President Truman commuted his sentence to life. After Collazo served 29 years in a federal prison, President Jimmy Carter commuted his sentence to time served and he was released in 1979.

During the 1950s and 1960s, Puerto Rico experienced rapid industrialization, due in large part to Operación Manos a la Obra ("Operation Bootstrap"), an offshoot of FDR's New Deal. It was intended to transform Puerto Rico's economy from agriculture-based to manufacturing-based to provide more jobs. Puerto Rico has become a major tourist destination, as well as a global center for pharmaceutical manufacturing.

21st century

On 15 July 2009, the United Nations Special Committee on Decolonization approved a draft resolution calling on the government of the United States to expedite a process that would allow the Puerto Rican people to exercise fully their inalienable right to self-determination and independence.

On 6 November 2012, a two-question referendum took place, simultaneous with the general elections. The first question, voted on in August, asked voters whether they wanted to maintain the current status under the territorial clause of the U.S. Constitution. 54% voted against the status quo, effectively approving the second question to be voted on in November. The second question posed three alternate status options: statehood, independence, or free association. 61.16% voted for statehood, 33.34% for a sovereign free associated state, and 5.49% for independence.

On 30 June 2016, President Obama signed into law H.R. 5278: PROMESA, establishing a Control Board over the Puerto Rican government. This board will have a significant degree of federal control involved in its establishment and operations. In particular, the authority to establish the control board derives from the federal government's constitutional power to "make all needful rules and regulations" regarding U.S. territories; The president would appoint all seven voting members of the board; and the board would have broad sovereign powers to effectively overrule decisions by Puerto Rico's legislature, governor, and other public authorities.

Puerto Rico held its statehood referendum during the 3 November 2020 general elections; the ballot asked one question: "Should Puerto Rico be admitted immediately into the Union as a State?" The results showed that 52 percent of Puerto Rico voters answered yes.

Environment

Puerto Rico consists of the main island of Puerto Rico and various smaller islands, including Vieques, Culebra, Mona, Desecheo, and Caja de Muertos. Of these five, only Culebra and Vieques are inhabited year-round. Mona, which has played a key role in maritime history, is uninhabited most of the year except for employees of the Puerto Rico Department of Natural Resources. There are many other even smaller islets, like Monito, which is near to Mona, Isla de Cabras and La Isleta de San Juan, both located on the San Juan Bay. The latter is the only inhabited islet with communities like Old San Juan and Puerta de Tierra, and connected to the main island by bridges.

Puerto Rico is larger than Delaware and Rhode Island. Puerto Rico is the smallest of the Greater Antilles. It is 80% of the size of Jamaica, just over 18% of the size of Hispaniola and 8% of the size of Cuba, the largest of the Greater Antilles.

The island is mostly mountainous with large coastal areas in the north and south. The main mountain range is called "La Cordillera Central" (The Central Range). The highest elevation in Puerto Rico, Cerro de Punta , is located in this range.

Puerto Rico has 17 lakes, all man-made, and more than 50 rivers, most originating in the Cordillera Central. Rivers in the northern region of the island are typically longer and of higher water flow rates than those of the south, since the south receives less rain than the central and northern regions.

Puerto Rico is composed of Cretaceous to Eocene volcanic and plutonic rocks, overlain by younger Oligocene and more recent carbonates and other sedimentary rocks. Most of the caverns and karst topography on the island occurs in the northern region in the carbonates. The oldest rocks are approximately  years old (Jurassic) and are located at Sierra Bermeja in the southwest part of the island. They may represent part of the oceanic crust and are believed to come from the Pacific Ocean realm.

Puerto Rico lies at the boundary between the Caribbean and North American plates and is being deformed by the tectonic stresses caused by their interaction. These stresses may cause earthquakes and tsunamis. These seismic events, along with landslides, represent some of the most dangerous geologic hazards in the island and in the northeastern Caribbean.

It originated off the coast of Aguadilla, several kilometers off the northern coast, and was accompanied by a tsunami. It caused extensive property damage and widespread losses, damaging infrastructure, especially bridges. It resulted in an estimated 116 deaths and $4 million in property damage. The failure of the government to move rapidly to provide for the general welfare contributed to political activism by opponents and eventually to the rise of the Puerto Rican Nationalist Party.

On 7 January 2020, the country experienced its second largest earthquake, estimated at magnitude 6.4. Economic losses were estimated to be more than $3.1 billion.

Climate

The climate of Puerto Rico in the Köppen climate classification is tropical rainforest. Temperatures are warm to hot year round, averaging near 85 °F (29 °C) in lower elevations and 70 °F (21 °C) in the mountains. Easterly trade winds pass across the island year round. Puerto Rico has a rainy season which stretches from April into November. The mountains of the Cordillera Central are the main cause of the variations in the temperature and rainfall that occur over very short distances. The mountains can also cause wide variation in local wind speed and direction due to their sheltering and channeling effects adding to the climatic variation.

Daily temperature changes seasonally are quite small in the lowlands and coastal areas. The temperature in the south is usually a few degrees higher than those in the north and temperatures in the central interior mountains are always cooler than those on the rest of the island.

This change is due mainly to the warm waters of the tropical Atlantic Ocean, which significantly modify cooler air moving in from the north and northwest.

Hurricanes 
Puerto Rico experiences the Atlantic hurricane season, similar to the remainder of the Caribbean Sea and North Atlantic oceans. On average, a quarter of its annual rainfall is contributed from tropical cyclones, which are more prevalent during periods of La Niña than El Niño. A cyclone of tropical storm strength passes near Puerto Rico, on average, every five years. A hurricane passes in the vicinity of the island, on average, every seven years. Since 1851, the Lake Okeechobee Hurricane (also known as the San Felipe Segundo hurricane in Puerto Rico) of September 1928 is the only hurricane to make landfall as a Category 5 hurricane.

Almost 50% of hospitals were operating with power provided by generators. The Category 4 Hurricane Jose, as expected, veered away from Puerto Rico. A short time later, the devastating Hurricane Maria made landfall on Puerto Rico on Wednesday, 20 September, near the Yabucoa municipality at 10:15 UTC (6:15 am local time) as a high-end Category 4 hurricane with sustained winds of 155 mph (250 km/h), powerful rains and widespread flooding causing tremendous destruction, including the electrical grid, which would remain out for 4–6 months in many portions of the island.

Hurricane Dorian was the third hurricane in three years to hit Puerto Rico in 2019. The recovering infrastructure from the 2017 hurricanes, as well as new governor Wanda Vázquez Garced, were put to the test against a potential humanitarian crisis. Tropical Storm Karen also caused impacts to Puerto Rico during 2019.

Climate change

Biodiversity

Puerto Rico is home to three terrestrial ecoregions: Puerto Rican moist forests, Puerto Rican dry forests, and Greater Antilles mangroves.

Species endemic to the archipelago number 239 plants, 16 birds and 39 amphibians/reptiles, recognized as of 1998. Most of these (234, 12 and 33 respectively) are found on the main island. The most recognizable endemic species and a symbol of Puerto Rican pride is the coquí, a small frog easily identified by the sound of its call, from which it gets its name. Most coquí species (13 of 17) live in the El Yunque National Forest, a tropical rainforest in the northeast of the island previously known as the Caribbean National Forest. El Yunque is home to more than 240 plants, 26 of which are endemic to the island. It is also home to 50 bird species, including the critically endangered Puerto Rican amazon.

Puerto Rico has three bioluminescent bays: rare bodies of water occupied by microscopic marine organisms that glow when touched. However, tourism, pollution, and hurricanes have threatened the organisms.

Demographics

The population of Puerto Rico has been shaped by initial Amerindian settlement, European colonization, slavery, economic migration, and Puerto Rico's status as unincorporated territory of the United States.

Population makeup

The population of Puerto Rico according to the 2020 census was 3,285,874, an 11.8% decrease since the 2010 United States Census. The commonwealth's population peaked in 2000, when it was 3,808,610, before declining (for the first time in census history) to 3,725,789 in 2010. Emigration due to economic difficulties and natural disasters, coupled with a low birth rate, have caused the population decline to continue in recent years.

Continuous European immigration and high natural increase helped the population of Puerto Rico grow from 155,426 in 1800 to almost a million by the close of the 19th century. A census conducted by royal decree on 30 September 1858, gave the following totals of the Puerto Rican population at that time: 341,015 were free colored; 300,430 were white; and 41,736 were slaves. A census in 1887 found a population of around 800,000, of which 320,000 were black.

During the 19th century, hundreds of families arrived in Puerto Rico, primarily from the Canary Islands and Andalusia, but also from other parts of Spain such as Catalonia, Asturias, Galicia and the Balearic Islands and numerous Spanish loyalists from Spain's former colonies in South America. Settlers from outside Spain also arrived in the islands, including from Corsica, France, Lebanon, China, Portugal, Ireland, Scotland, Germany and Italy. This immigration from non-Hispanic countries was the result of the Real Cedula de Gracias de 1815 ("Royal Decree of Graces of 1815"), which allowed European Catholics to settle in the island with land allotments in the interior of the island, provided they paid taxes and continued to support the Catholic Church.

Between 1960 and 1990, the census questionnaire in Puerto Rico did not ask about race or ethnicity. The 2000 United States Census included a racial self-identification question in Puerto Rico. According to the census, most Puerto Ricans identified as white and Latino; few identified as black or some other race.

Population genetics

A group of researchers from Puerto Rican universities conducted a study of mitochondrial DNA that revealed that the modern population of Puerto Rico has a high genetic component of Taíno and Guanche (especially of the island of Tenerife).
Other studies show Amerindian ancestry in addition to the Taíno.

One genetic study on the racial makeup of Puerto Ricans (including all races) found them to be roughly around 61% West Eurasian/North African (overwhelmingly of Spanish provenance), 27% Sub-Saharan African and 11% Native American. Another genetic study, from 2007, claimed that "the average genomewide individual (i.e., Puerto Rican) ancestry proportions have been estimated as 66%, 18%, and 16%, for European, West African, and Native American, respectively." Another study estimates 63.7% European, 21.2% (Sub-Saharan) African, and 15.2% Native American; European ancestry is more prevalent in the West and in Central Puerto Rico, African in Eastern Puerto Rico, and Native American in Northern Puerto Rico.

Literacy
A Pew Research survey indicated an adult literacy rate of 90.4% in 2012 based on data from the United Nations.

Life expectancy
Puerto Rico has a life expectancy of approximately 81.0 years according to the CIA World Factbook, an improvement from 78.7 years in 2010. This means Puerto Rico has the second-highest life expectancy in the United States, if territories are taken into account.

Immigration and emigration

As of 2019, Puerto Rico was home to 100,000 permanent legal residents. The vast majority of recent immigrants, both legal and illegal, come from the Dominican Republic and Haiti. Other major sources of recent immigrants include Cuba, Mexico, Colombia, Panama, Jamaica, Venezuela, Spain, and Nigeria. Additionally, there are many non-Puerto Rican U.S. citizens settling in Puerto Rico from the mainland United States and the U.S. Virgin Islands, as well as Nuyoricans  and other stateside Puerto Ricans coming back. Most recent immigrants settle in and around San Juan.

Emigration is a major part of contemporary Puerto Rican history. Starting soon after World War II, poverty, cheap airfares, and promotion by the island government caused waves of Puerto Ricans to move to the United States mainland, particularly to the northeastern states and nearby Florida. This trend continued even as Puerto Rico's economy improved and its birth rate declined. Puerto Ricans continue to follow a pattern of "circular migration", with some migrants returning to the island. In recent years, the population has declined markedly, falling nearly 1% in 2012 and an additional 1% (36,000 people) in 2013 due to a falling birthrate and emigration. The impact of hurricanes Maria and Irma in 2017, combined with the unincorporated territory's worsening economy, led to its greatest population decline since the U.S. acquired the archipelago.

According to the 2010 Census, the number of Puerto Ricans living in the United States outside of Puerto Rico far exceeds those living in Puerto Rico. Emigration exceeds immigration. As those who leave tend to be better educated than those who remain, this accentuates the drain on Puerto Rico's economy.

Based on 1 July 2019 estimate by the U.S. Census Bureau, the population of the Commonwealth had declined by 532,095 people since the 2010 Census data had been tabulated.

Population distribution

The most populous municipality is the capital, San Juan, with 342,259 people based on the 2020 Census. Other major cities include Bayamón, Carolina, Ponce, and Caguas. Of the ten most populous cities on the island, eight are located within what is considered San Juan's metropolitan area, while the other two are located in the south (Ponce) and west (Mayagüez) of the island.

Languages

The official languages of the executive branch of government of Puerto Rico are Spanish and English, with Spanish being the primary language. Spanish is, and has been, the only official language of the entire Commonwealth judiciary system, despite a 1902 English-only language law. However, all official business of the U.S. District Court for the District of Puerto Rico is conducted in English. English is the primary language of less than 10% of the population. Spanish is the dominant language of business, education and daily life on the island, spoken by nearly 95% of the population.

Out of people age five and older, 94.3% speak only Spanish at home, 5.5% speak English, and 0.2% speak other languages.

In Puerto Rico, public school instruction is conducted almost entirely in Spanish. There have been pilot programs in about a dozen of the over 1,400 public schools aimed at conducting instruction in English only. Objections from teaching staff are common, perhaps because many of them are not fully fluent in English. English is taught as a second language and is a compulsory subject from elementary levels to high school. The languages of the deaf community are American Sign Language and its local variant, Puerto Rican Sign Language.

The Spanish of Puerto Rico has evolved into having many idiosyncrasies in vocabulary and syntax that differentiate it from the Spanish spoken elsewhere. As a product of Puerto Rican history, the island possesses a unique Spanish dialect. Puerto Rican Spanish utilizes many Taíno words, as well as English words. The largest influence on the Spanish spoken in Puerto Rico is that of the Canary Islands. Taíno loanwords are most often used in the context of vegetation, natural phenomena, and native musical instruments. Similarly, words attributed to primarily West African languages were adopted in the contexts of foods, music, and dances, particularly in coastal towns with concentrations of descendants of Sub-Saharan Africans.

Religion

Catholicism was brought by Spanish colonists and gradually became the dominant religion in Puerto Rico. The first dioceses in the Americas, including that of Puerto Rico, were authorized by Pope Julius II in 1511. In 1512, priests were established for the parochial churches. By 1759, there was a priest for each church. One Pope, John Paul II, visited Puerto Rico in October 1984. All municipalities in Puerto Rico have at least one Catholic church, most of which are located at the town center, or plaza.

Protestantism, which was suppressed under the Spanish Catholic regime, has reemerged under United States rule, making contemporary Puerto Rico more interconfessional than in previous centuries, although Catholicism continues to be the dominant religion. The first Protestant church, Iglesia de la Santísima Trinidad, was established in Ponce by the Anglican Diocese of Antigua in 1872. It was the first non-Catholic church in the entire Spanish Empire in the Americas.

Pollster Pablo Ramos stated in 1998 that the population was 38% Roman Catholic, 28% Pentecostal, and 18% were members of independent churches, which would give a Protestant percentage of 46% if the last two populations are combined. Protestants collectively added up to almost two million people. Another researcher gave a more conservative assessment of the proportion of Protestants:
Puerto Rico, by virtue of its long political association with the United States, is the most Protestant of Latin American countries, with a Protestant population of approximately 33 to 38 percent, the majority of whom are Pentecostal. David Stoll calculates that if we extrapolate the growth rates of evangelical churches from 1960 to 1985 for another twenty-five years Puerto Rico will become 75 percent evangelical. (Ana Adams: "Brincando el Charco..." in Power, Politics and Pentecostals in Latin America, Edward Cleary, ed., 1997. p. 164).

An Associated Press article in March 2014 stated that "more than 70 percent of whom identify themselves as Catholic" but provided no source for this information.

The CIA World Factbook reports that 85% of the population of Puerto Rico identifies as Roman Catholic, while 15% identify as Protestant and Other. Neither a date or a source for that information is provided and may not be recent. A 2013 Pew Research survey found that only about 45% of Puerto Rican adults identified themselves as Catholic, 29% as Protestant and 20% as unaffiliated with a religion. The people surveyed by Pew consisted of Puerto Ricans living in the 50 states and DC and may not be indicative of those living in the Commonwealth.

By 2014, a Pew Research report, with the sub-title Widespread Change in a Historically Catholic Region, indicated that only 56% of Puerto Ricans were Catholic, 33% were Protestant, and 8% were unaffiliated; this survey was completed between October 2013 and February 2014.

An Eastern Orthodox community, the Dormition of the Most Holy Theotokos / St. Spyridon's Church is located in Trujillo Alto, and serves the small Orthodox community. In 2017, the church entered communion with the Roman Catholic Church, becoming the first Eastern Catholic Church in Puerto Rico.  This affiliation accounted for under 1% of the population in 2010 according to the Pew Research report. In 1940, Juanita García Peraza founded the Mita Congregation, the first religion of Puerto Rican origin. Taíno religious practices have been rediscovered/reinvented to a degree by a handful of advocates. Similarly, some aspects of African religious traditions have been kept by some adherents. African slaves brought and maintained various ethnic African religious practices associated with different peoples; in particular, the Yoruba beliefs of Santería and/or Ifá, and the Kongo-derived Palo Mayombe. Some aspects were absorbed into syncretic Christianity. In 1952, a handful of American Jews established the island's first synagogue; this religion accounts for under 1% of the population in 2010 according to the Pew Research report. The synagogue, called Sha'are Zedeck, hired its first rabbi in 1954. Puerto Rico has the largest Jewish community in the Caribbean, numbering 3000 people, and is the only Caribbean island in which the Conservative, Reform and Orthodox Jewish movements all are represented. In 2007, there were about 5,000 Muslims in Puerto Rico, representing about 0.13% of the population. Eight mosques are located throughout the island, with most Muslims living in Río Piedras and Caguas; most Muslims are of Palestinian and Jordanian descent. There is also a Baháʼí community. In 2015, the 25,832 Jehovah's Witnesses represented about 0.70% of the population, with 324 congregations. The Padmasambhava Buddhist Center, whose followers practice Tibetan Buddhism, as well as Nichiren Buddhism have branches in Puerto Rico. There are several atheist activist and educational organizations, and an atheistic parody religion called the Pastafarian Church of Puerto Rico. An ISKCON temple in Gurabo is devoted to Krishna Consciousness, with two preaching centers in the metropolitan area.

Government

Puerto Rico has a republican form of government based on the American model, with separation of powers subject to the jurisdiction and sovereignty of the United States. All governmental powers are delegated by the United States Congress, with the head of state being president of the United States. As an unincorporated territory, Puerto Rico lacks full protection under the United States Constitution.

The government of Puerto Rico is composed of three branches. The executive is headed by the governor, currently Pedro Pierluisi Urrutia. The legislative branch consists of the bicameral Legislative Assembly, made up of a Senate as its upper chamber and a House of Representatives as its lower chamber; the Senate is headed by a president, currently José Luis Dalmau, while the House is headed by the speaker of the House, currently Tatito Hernández. The governor and legislators are elected by popular vote every four years, with the last election held in November 2020. The judicial branch is headed by the chief justice of the Supreme Court of Puerto Rico, currently Maite Oronoz Rodríguez. Members of the judiciary are appointed by the governor with the advice and consent of the Senate.

Puerto Rico is represented in the U.S. Congress by a nonvoting delegate to the House of Representatives, the resident commissioner, currently Jenniffer González. Current congressional rules have removed the commissioner's power to vote in the Committee of the Whole, but the commissioner can vote in committee.

Puerto Rican elections are governed by the Federal Election Commission and the State Elections Commission of Puerto Rico. Residents of Puerto Rico, including other U.S. citizens, cannot vote in U.S. presidential elections, but can vote in primaries. Puerto Ricans who become residents of a U.S. state or the District of Columbia can vote in presidential elections.

Puerto Rico has 8 senatorial districts, 40 representative districts and 78 municipalities; there are no first-order administrative divisions as defined by the U.S. government. Municipalities are subdivided into wards or barrios, and those into sectors. Each municipality has a mayor and a municipal legislature elected for a four-year term. The municipality of San Juan is the oldest, founded in 1521; the next earliest settlements are San Germán in 1570, Coamo in 1579, Arecibo in 1614, Aguada in 1692 and Ponce in 1692. Increased settlement in the 18th century saw 30 more communities established, following 34 in the 19th centuryl six were founded in the 20th century, the most recent being Florida in 1971.

Political parties and elections

Since 1952, Puerto Rico has had three main political parties: the Popular Democratic Party (PPD in Spanish), the New Progressive Party (PNP in Spanish) and the Puerto Rican Independence Party (PIP). The three parties stand for different political status. The PPD, for example, seeks to maintain the island's status with the U.S. as a commonwealth, while the PNP, on the other hand, seeks to make Puerto Rico a state of the United States. The PIP, in contrast, seeks a complete separation from the United States by seeking to make Puerto Rico a sovereign nation. In terms of party strength, the PPD and PNP usually hold about 47% of the vote each while the PIP holds  about 5%.

After 2007, other parties emerged on the island. The first, the Puerto Ricans for Puerto Rico Party (PPR in Spanish) was registered that same year. The party claims that it seeks to address the islands' problems from a status-neutral platform. But it ceased to remain as a registered party when it failed to obtain the required number of votes in the 2008 general election. Four years later, the 2012 election saw the emergence of the Movimiento Unión Soberanista (MUS; English: Sovereign Union Movement) and the Partido del Pueblo Trabajador (PPT; English: Working People's Party) but none obtained more than 1% of the vote.

Other non-registered parties include the Puerto Rican Nationalist Party, the Socialist Workers Movement, and the Hostosian National Independence Movement.

Law

The insular legal system is a blend of civil law and the common law systems.

Puerto Rico is the only current U.S. jurisdiction whose legal system operates primarily in a language other than American English: namely, Spanish. Because the U.S. federal government operates primarily in English, all Puerto Rican attorneys must be bilingual in order to litigate in English in U.S. federal courts, and litigate federal preemption issues in Puerto Rican courts.

Title 48 of the United States Code outlines the role of the United States Code to United States territories and insular areas such as Puerto Rico. After the U.S. government assumed control of Puerto Rico in 1901, it initiated legal reforms resulting in the adoption of codes of criminal law, criminal procedure, and civil procedure modeled after those then in effect in California. Although Puerto Rico has since followed the federal example of transferring criminal and civil procedure from statutory law to rules promulgated by the judiciary, several portions of its criminal law still reflect the influence of the California Penal Code.

The judicial branch is headed by the chief justice of the Puerto Rico Supreme Court, which is the only appellate court required by the Constitution. All other courts are created by the Legislative Assembly of Puerto Rico. There is also a Federal District Court for Puerto Rico, and someone accused of a criminal act at the federal level may not be accused for the same act in a Commonwealth court, and vice versa, since Puerto Rico as an unincorporated territory lacks sovereignty separate from Congress as a state does. Such a parallel accusation would constitute double jeopardy.

Political status

The nature of Puerto Rico's political relationship with the U.S. is the subject of ongoing debate in Puerto Rico, the United States Congress, and the United Nations. Specifically, the basic question is whether Puerto Rico should remain an unincorporated territory of the U.S., become a U.S. state, or become an independent country.

Constitutionally, Puerto Rico is subject to the plenary powers of the United States Congress under the territorial clause of Article IV of the U.S. Constitution. Laws enacted at the federal level in the United States apply to Puerto Rico as well, regardless of its political status. Their residents do not have voting representation in the U.S. Congress. Like the different states of the United States, Puerto Rico lacks "the full sovereignty of an independent nation", for example, the power to manage its "external relations with other nations", which is held by the U.S. federal government. The Supreme Court of the United States has indicated that once the U.S. Constitution has been extended to an area (by Congress or the courts), its coverage is irrevocable. To hold that the political branches may switch the Constitution on or off at will would lead to a regime in which they, not this Court, say "what the law is".

Puerto Ricans "were collectively made U.S. citizens" in 1917 as a result of the Jones-Shafroth Act. U.S. citizens residing in Puerto Rico cannot vote in U.S. presidential elections, though both major parties, Republican and Democratic, hold primary elections in Puerto Rico to choose delegates to vote on the parties' presidential candidates. Since Puerto Rico is an unincorporated territory (see above) and not a U.S. state, the United States Constitution does not fully enfranchise U.S. citizens residing in Puerto Rico.

Only fundamental rights under the American federal constitution and adjudications are applied to Puerto Ricans. Various other U.S. Supreme Court decisions have held which rights apply in Puerto Rico and which ones do not. Puerto Ricans have a long history of service in the U.S. Armed Forces and, since 1917, they have been included in the U.S. compulsory draft whensoever it has been in effect.

Though the Commonwealth government has its own tax laws, residents of Puerto Rico, contrary to a popular misconception, do pay U.S. federal taxes: customs taxes (which are subsequently returned to the Puerto Rico Treasury), import/export taxes, federal commodity taxes, social security taxes , etc. Residents pay federal payroll taxes, such as Social Security and Medicare, as well as Commonwealth of Puerto Rico income taxes. All federal employees, those who do business with the federal government, Puerto Rico-based corporations that intend to send funds to the U.S., and some others, such as Puerto Rican residents that are members of the U.S. military, and Puerto Rico residents who earned income from sources outside Puerto Rico also pay federal income taxes. In addition, because the cutoff point for income taxation is lower than that of the U.S. IRS code, and because the per-capita income in Puerto Rico is much lower than the average per-capita income on the mainland, more Puerto Rico residents pay income taxes to the local taxation authority than if the IRS code were applied to the island. This occurs because "the Commonwealth of Puerto Rico government has a wider set of responsibilities than do U.S. State and local governments." 

In 2009, Puerto Rico paid  into the U.S. Treasury. Residents of Puerto Rico pay into Social Security, and are thus eligible for Social Security benefits upon retirement. They are excluded from the Supplemental Security Income (SSI), and the island actually receives a smaller fraction of the Medicaid funding it would receive if it were a U.S. state. Also, Medicare providers receive less-than-full state-like reimbursements for services rendered to beneficiaries in Puerto Rico, even though the latter paid fully into the system.

Puerto Rico's authority to enact a criminal code derives from Congress and not from local sovereignty as with the states. Thus, individuals committing a crime can only be tried in federal or territorial court, otherwise it would constitute double jeopardy and is constitutionally impermissible.

In 1992, President George H. W. Bush issued a memorandum to heads of executive departments and agencies establishing the current administrative relationship between the federal government and the Commonwealth of Puerto Rico. This memorandum directs all federal departments, agencies, and officials to treat Puerto Rico administratively as if it were a state, insofar as doing so would not disrupt federal programs or operations.

Many federal executive branch agencies have significant presence in Puerto Rico, just as in any state, including the Federal Bureau of Investigation, Federal Emergency Management Agency, Transportation Security Administration, Social Security Administration, and others. While Puerto Rico has its own Commonwealth judicial system similar to that of a U.S. state, there is also a U.S. federal district court in Puerto Rico, and Puerto Ricans have served as judges in that Court and in other federal courts on the U.S. mainland regardless of their residency status at the time of their appointment. Sonia Sotomayor, a New Yorker of Puerto Rican descent, serves as an associate justice of the Supreme Court of the United States. Puerto Ricans have also been frequently appointed to high-level federal positions, including serving as United States ambassadors to other nations.

Foreign and intergovernmental relations

Puerto Rico is subject to the Commerce and Territorial Clause of the U.S. Constitution, and is thus restricted on how it can engage with other nations, sharing the opportunities and limitations that state governments have albeit not being one. As is the case with state governments, it has established several trade agreements with other nations, particularly with Latin American countries such as Colombia and Panamá.

It has also established trade promotion offices in many foreign countries, all Spanish-speaking, and within the United States itself, which now include Spain, the Dominican Republic, Panama, Colombia, Washington, D.C., New York City and Florida, and has included in the past offices in Chile, Costa Rica, and Mexico. Such agreements require permission from the U.S. Department of State; most are simply allowed by existing laws or trade treaties between the United States and other nations which supersede trade agreements pursued by Puerto Rico and different U.S. states. Puerto Rico hosts consulates from 41 countries, mainly from the Americas and Europe, with most located in San Juan.

At the local level, Puerto Rico established by law that the international relations which states and territories are allowed to engage must be handled by the Department of State of Puerto Rico, an executive department, headed by the secretary of state of Puerto Rico, who also serves as the unincorporated territory's lieutenant governor. It is also charged to liaise with general consuls and honorary consuls based in Puerto Rico. The Puerto Rico Federal Affairs Administration, along with the Office of the Resident Commissioner, manages all its intergovernmental affairs before entities of or in the United States (including the federal government of the United States, local and state governments of the United States, and public or private entities in the United States).

Both entities frequently assist the Department of State of Puerto Rico in engaging with Washington, D.C.-based ambassadors and federal agencies that handle Puerto Rico's foreign affairs, such as the U.S. Department of State, the Agency for International Development, and others. The current secretary of state is Larry Seilhamer Rodríguez from the New Progressive Party, while the current director of the Puerto Rico Federal Affairs Administration is Jennifer M. Stopiran also from the NPP and a member of the Republican Party of the United States.

The resident commissioner of Puerto Rico, the delegate elected by Puerto Ricans to represent them before the federal government, including the U.S. Congress, sits in the United States House of Representatives, serves and votes on congressional committees, and functions in every respect as a legislator except being denied a vote on the final disposition of legislation on the House floor. The current resident commissioner is Jenniffer González-Colón, a Republican, elected in 2016. She received more votes than any other official elected in Puerto Rico that year.

Many Puerto Ricans have served as United States ambassadors to different nations and international organizations, such as the Organization of American States, mostly but not exclusively in Latin America. For example, Maricarmen Aponte, a Puerto Rican and now an acting assistant secretary of state, previously served as U.S. ambassador to El Salvador.

Military

As it is an unincorporated territory of the United States, the defense of Puerto Rico is provided by the United States as part of the Treaty of Paris with the president of the United States as its commander-in-chief. Puerto Rico has its own National Guard, and its own state defense force, the Puerto Rico State Guard, which by local law is under the authority of the Puerto Rico National Guard.

The commander-in-chief of both local forces is the governor of Puerto Rico who delegates his authority to the Puerto Rico adjutant general, currently Major General José J. Reyes. The Adjutant General, in turn, delegates the authority over the State Guard to another officer but retains the authority over the Puerto Rico National Guard as a whole.
U.S. military installations in Puerto Rico were part of the U.S. Atlantic Command (LANTCOM after 1993 USACOM), which had authority over all U.S. military operations that took place throughout the Atlantic. Puerto Rico had been seen as crucial in supporting LANTCOM's mission until 1999, when U.S. Atlantic Command was renamed and given a new mission as United States Joint Forces Command. Puerto Rico is currently under the responsibility of United States Northern Command.

Both the Naval Forces Caribbean (NFC) and the Fleet Air Caribbean (FAIR) were formerly based at the Roosevelt Roads Naval Station. The NFC had authority over all U.S. Naval activity in the waters of the Caribbean while FAIR had authority over all U.S. military flights and air operations over the Caribbean. With the closing of the Roosevelt Roads and Vieques Island training facilities, the U.S. Navy has basically exited from Puerto Rico, except for the ships that steam by, and the only significant military presence in the island is the U.S. Army at Ft Buchanan, the Puerto Rican Army and Air National Guards, and the U.S. Coast Guard. Protests over the noise of bombing practice forced the closure of the naval base. This resulted in a loss of 6,000 jobs and an annual decrease in local income of $300 million.

A branch of the U.S. Army National Guard is stationed in Puerto Rico – known as the Puerto Rico Army National Guard – which performs missions equivalent to those of the Army National Guards of the different states of the United States, including ground defense, disaster relief, and control of civil unrest. The local National Guard also incorporates a branch of the U.S. Air National Guard – known as the Puerto Rico Air National Guard – which performs missions equivalent to those of the Air National Guards of each one of the U.S. states.

At different times in the 20th century, the U.S. had about 25 military or naval installations in Puerto Rico, some very small ones, as well as large installations. The largest of these installations were the former Roosevelt Roads Naval Station in Ceiba, the Atlantic Fleet Weapons Training Facility (AFWTF) on Vieques, the National Guard training facility at Camp Santiago in Salinas, Fort Allen in Juana Diaz, the Army's Fort Buchanan in San Juan, the former U.S. Air Force's Ramey Air Force Base in Aguadilla, and the Puerto Rico Air National Guard's Muñiz Air National Guard Base in San Juan.

The former U.S. Navy facilities at Roosevelt Roads, Vieques, and Sabana Seca have been deactivated and partially turned over to the local government. Other than U.S. Coast Guard and Puerto Rico National Guard facilities, there are only two remaining military installations in Puerto Rico: the U.S. Army's small Ft. Buchanan (supporting local veterans and reserve units) and the PRANG (Puerto Rico Air National Guard) Muñiz Air Base (the C-130 Fleet). In recent years, the U.S. Congress has considered their deactivations, but these have been opposed by diverse public and private entities in Puerto Rico – such as retired military who rely on Ft. Buchanan for the services available there.

Puerto Ricans have participated in many United States military conflicts, including the American Revolution, when volunteers from Puerto Rico, Cuba, and Mexico fought the British in 1779 under the command of General Bernardo de Gálvez (1746–1786). They continue to be disproportionately represented in present-day conflicts in Iraq and Afghanistan. The most notable example is the 65th Infantry Regiment of the United States Army, nicknamed The Borinqueneers, from the original Taíno name of the island (Borinquen). The all-Puerto Rican regiment participated in World War I, World War II, the Korean War, and the War on Terror; in 2014, it was awarded the Congressional Gold Medal for its heroism during the Korean War.

A significant number of Puerto Ricans serve in the U.S. Armed Forces, largely as National Guard members and civilian employees. The size of the overall military-related community is estimated to be 100,000, including retired personnel. Fort Buchanan has about 4,000 military and civilian personnel. In addition, approximately 17,000 people are members of the Puerto Rico Army and Air National Guards, or the U.S. Reserve forces.

Administrative divisions

Unlike the vast majority of U.S. states, Puerto Rico has no first-order administrative divisions akin to counties, but has 78 municipalities or municipios as the secondary unit of administration; for U.S. Census purposes, the municipalities are considered county equivalents. Municipalities are subdivided into barrios, and those into sectors. Each municipality has a mayor and a municipal legislature elected for four-year terms, per the Autonomous Municipalities Act of 1991.

Economy

Puerto Rico is classified as a high income economy by the World Bank and International Monetary Fund. It is considered the most competitive economy in Latin America by the World Economic Forum and ranks highly on the Human Development Index. According to World Bank, gross national income per capita in Puerto Rico in 2020 was $21,740. Puerto Rico's economy is mainly driven by manufacturing (primarily pharmaceuticals, textiles, petrochemicals and electronics) followed by services (primarily finance, insurance, real estate and tourism); agriculture represents less than 1% of GNP. In recent years, it has also become a popular destination for MICE (meetings, incentives, conferencing, exhibitions), with a modern convention centre district overlooking the Port of San Juan.

Responsibility for San Juan port inspections lies with PPQ. So high is the volume of cargo traffic that between 19842000 the San Juan PPQ station recorded 7.74% of all interceptions, #4 in the country, #2 for insects and #3 for pathogens. Most species are originally from South America or elsewhere in the Caribbean due to PR's position as an intermediary on the way to the mainland. This is one of the worst locations for cut flowers and other plant parts  both in terms of number of problems and diversity of species  for insects in plant parts in baggage, and for pathogens in plant parts in baggage and cargo. Pathogen interceptions were dramatically (17%) higher 19992000 than in 19851986.

Puerto Rico's geography and political status are both determining factors for its economic prosperity, primarily due to its relatively small size; lack of natural resources and subsequent dependence on imports; and vulnberability to U.S. foreign policy and trading restrictions, particularly concerning its shipping industry.

Puerto Rico experienced a recession from 2006 to 2011, interrupted by four quarters of economic growth, and entered into recession again in 2013, following growing fiscal imbalance and the expiration of the IRS Section 936 corporate incentives that the U.S. Internal Revenue Code had applied to Puerto Rico. This IRS section was critical to the economy, as it established tax exemptions for U.S. corporations that settled in Puerto Rico, and allowed their insular subsidiaries to send their earnings to the parent corporation at any time, without paying federal tax on corporate income. Puerto Rico has surprisingly been able to maintain a relatively low inflation in the past decade while maintaining a purchasing power parity per capita higher than 80% of the rest of the world.

Academically, most of Puerto Rico's economic woes stem from federal regulations that expired, have been repealed, or no longer apply to Puerto Rico; its inability to become self-sufficient and self-sustainable throughout history; its highly politicized public policy which tends to change whenever a political party gains power; as well as its highly inefficient local government which has accrued a public debt equal to 68% of its gross domestic product throughout time. Puerto Rico currently has a public debt of $72.204 billion (equivalent to 103% of GNP), and a government deficit of $2.5 billion. 

By American standards, Puerto Rico is underdeveloped: It is poorer than Mississippi, the poorest state of the U.S., with 41% of its population below the poverty line. However, it has the highest GDP per capita in Latin America. Puerto Rico's main trading partners are the United States, Ireland, and Japan, with most products coming from East Asia, mainly China, Hong Kong, and Taiwan. Puerto Rico's dependency on oil for transportation and electricity generation, as well as its dependency on food imports and raw materials, makes Puerto Rico volatile and highly reactive to changes in the world economy and climate.

Tourism 
Tourism in Puerto Rico is also an important part of the economy. In 2017, Hurricane Maria caused severe damage to the island and its infrastructure, disrupting tourism for many months. The damage was estimated at $100 billion. An April 2019 report indicated that by that time, only a few hotels were still closed, that life for tourists in and around the capital had, for the most part, returned to normal. By October 2019, nearly all of the popular amenities for tourists, in the major destinations such as San Juan, Ponce and Arecibo, were in operation on the island and tourism was rebounding. This was important for the economy, since tourism provides up to 10% of Puerto Rico's GDP, according to Discover Puerto Rico.

The latest Discover Puerto Rico campaign started in July 2018. An April 2019 report stated that the tourism team "after hitting the one-year anniversary of the storm in September [2018], the organization began to shift towards more optimistic messaging. The "Have We Met Yet?" campaign was intended to highlight the island's culture and history, making it distinct, different from other Caribbean destinations. In 2019, Discover Puerto Rico planned to continue that campaign, including "streaming options for branded content".

In late November 2019, reports indicated that 90 calls to San Juan by Royal Caribbean ships would be cancelled during 2020 and 2021. This step would mean 360,000 fewer visitors, with a loss to the island's economy of 44 million. As well, 30 ship departures from San Juan were being canceled. The rationale for this decision was discussed in a news report:The reason for the cancellations is the privatization of the cruise docks in San Juan due to much-needed maintenance that is needed. Around $250 million investment is needed to make sure cruise ships can continue to dock there in the years to come. There is an urge for governor Wanda Vazquez to not go ahead with the privatization so this news is fluid.

Fiscal debt 
In early 2017, the Puerto Rican government-debt crisis posed serious problems for the government which was saddled with outstanding bond debt that had climbed to $70 billion. The debt had been increasing during a decade-long recession.

The Commonwealth had been defaulting on many debts, including bonds, since 2015. With debt payments due, the governor was facing the risk of a government shutdown and failure to fund the managed health care system. "Without action before April, Puerto Rico's ability to execute contracts for Fiscal Year 2018 with its managed care organizations will be threatened, thereby putting at risk beginning July 1, 2017 the health care of up to 900,000 poor U.S. citizens living in Puerto Rico", according to a letter sent to Congress by the Secretary of the Treasury and the Secretary of Health and Human Services. They also said that "Congress must enact measures recommended by both Republicans and Democrats that fix Puerto Rico's inequitable health care financing structure and promote sustained economic growth."

Initially, the oversight board created under PROMESA called for Puerto Rico's governor Ricardo Rosselló to deliver a fiscal turnaround plan by 28 January. Just before that deadline, the control board gave the Commonwealth government until 28 February to present a fiscal plan (including negotiations with creditors for restructuring debt) to solve the problems. A moratorium on lawsuits by debtors was extended to 31 May. It is essential for Puerto Rico to reach restructuring deals to avoid a bankruptcy-like process under PROMESA. An internal survey conducted by the Puerto Rican Economists Association revealed that the majority of Puerto Rican economists reject the policy recommendations of the Board and the Rosselló government, with more than 80% of economists arguing in favor of auditing the debt.

In early August 2017, the island's financial oversight board (created by PROMESA) planned to institute two days off without pay per month for government employees, down from the original plan of four days per month; the latter had been expected to achieve $218 million in savings. Governor Rossello rejected this plan as unjustified and unnecessary. Pension reforms were also discussed including a proposal for a 10% reduction in benefits to begin addressing the $50 billion in unfunded pension liabilities.

Public finances

Puerto Rico has an operating budget of about U.S.$9.8 billion with expenses at about $10.4 billion, creating a structural deficit of $775 million (about 7.9% of the budget). The practice of approving budgets with a structural deficit has been done for  consecutive years starting in 2000. Throughout those years, including present time, all budgets contemplated issuing bonds to cover these projected deficits rather than making structural adjustments. This practice increased Puerto Rico's cumulative debt, as the government had already been issuing bonds to balance its actual budget for four decades beginning in 1973.

Projected deficits added substantial burdens to an already indebted nation which accrued a public debt of $71B or about 70% of Puerto Rico's gross domestic product. This sparked an ongoing government-debt crisis after Puerto Rico's general obligation bonds were downgraded to speculative non-investment grade ("junk status") by three credit-rating agencies. In terms of financial control, almost 9.6%—or about $1.5 billion—of Puerto Rico's central government budget expenses for FY2014 is expected to be spent on debt service. Harsher budget cuts are expected as Puerto Rico must now repay larger chunks of debts in the coming years.

For practical reasons the budget is divided into two aspects: a "general budget" which comprises the assignments funded exclusively by the Department of Treasury of Puerto Rico, and the "consolidated budget" which comprises the assignments funded by the general budget, by Puerto Rico's government-owned corporations, by revenue expected from loans, by the sale of government bonds, by subsidies extended by the federal government of the United States, and by other funds.

Both budgets contrast each other drastically, with the consolidated budget being usually thrice the size of the general budget; currently $29B and $9.0B respectively. Almost one out of every four dollars in the consolidated budget comes from U.S. federal subsidies while government-owned corporations compose more than 31% of the consolidated budget.

The critical aspects come from the sale of bonds, which comprise 7% of the consolidated budget – a ratio that increased annually due to the government's inability to prepare a balanced budget in addition to being incapable of generating enough income to cover all its expenses. In particular, the government-owned corporations add a heavy burden to the overall budget and public debt, as none is self-sufficient. For example, in FY2011 the government-owned corporations reported aggregated losses of more than $1.3B with the Puerto Rico Highways and Transportation Authority (PRHTA) reporting losses of $409M, the Puerto Rico Electric Power Authority (PREPA; the government monopoly that controls all electricity on the island) reporting losses of $272M, while the Puerto Rico Aqueducts and Sewers Authority (PRASA; the government monopoly that controls all water utilities on the island) reported losses of $112M.

Losses by government-owned corporations have been defrayed through the issuance of bonds compounding more than 40% of Puerto Rico's entire public debt today. Holistically, from FY2000–FY2010 Puerto Rico's debt grew at a compound annual growth rate (CAGR) of 9% while GDP remained stagnant. This has not always provided a long-term solution. In early July 2017 for example, the PREPA power authority was effectively bankrupt after defaulting in a plan to restructure $9 billion in bond debt; the agency planned to seek Court protection.

In terms of protocol, the governor, together with the Puerto Rico Office of Management and Budget (OGP in Spanish), formulates the budget he believes is required to operate all government branches for the ensuing fiscal year. He then submits this formulation as a budget request to the Puerto Rican legislature before 1 July, the date established by law as the beginning of Puerto Rico's fiscal year. While the constitution establishes that the request must be submitted "at the beginning of each regular session", the request is typically submitted during the first week of May as the regular sessions of the legislature begin in January and it would be impractical to submit a request so far in advance. Once submitted, the budget is then approved by the legislature, typically with amendments, through a joint resolution and is referred back to the governor for his approval. The governor then either approves it or vetoes it. If vetoed, the legislature can then either refer it back with amendments for the governor's approval, or approve it without the governor's consent by two-thirds of the bodies of each chamber.

Once the budget is approved, the Department of Treasury disburses funds to the Office of Management and Budget which in turn disburses the funds to the respective agencies, while the Puerto Rico Government Development Bank (the government's intergovernmental bank) manages all related banking affairs including those related to the government-owned corporations.

Cost of living

The cost of living in Puerto Rico is high and has increased over the past decade.

Statistics used for cost of living sometimes do not take into account certain costs, such as the high cost of electricity, which has hovered in the 24¢ to 30¢ range per kilowatt/hour, two to three times the national average, increased travel costs for longer flights, additional shipping fees, and the loss of promotional participation opportunities for customers "outside the continental United States". While some online stores do offer free shipping on orders to Puerto Rico, many merchants exclude Hawaii, Alaska, Puerto Rico and other United States territories.

The household median income is stated as $19,350 and the mean income as $30,463 in the U.S. Census Bureau's 2015 update. The report also indicates that 45.5% of individuals are below the poverty level. The median home value in Puerto Rico ranges from U.S.$100,000 to U.S.$214,000, while the national median home value sits at $119,600.

One of the most cited contributors to the high cost of living in Puerto Rico is the Merchant Marine Act of 1920, also known as the Jones Act, which prevents foreign-flagged ships from carrying cargo between two American ports, a practice known as cabotage. Because of the Jones Act, foreign ships inbound with goods from Central and South America, Western Europe, and Africa cannot stop in Puerto Rico, offload Puerto Rico-bound goods, load mainland-bound Puerto Rico-manufactured goods, and continue to U.S. ports. Instead, they must proceed directly to U.S. ports, where distributors break bulk and send Puerto Rico-bound manufactured goods to Puerto Rico across the ocean by U.S.-flagged ships.

The local government of Puerto Rico has requested several times to the U.S. Congress to exclude Puerto Rico from the Jones Act restrictions without success. The most recent measure has been taken by the 17th Legislative Assembly of Puerto Rico through R. Conc. del S. 21. These measures have always received support from all the major local political parties.

In 2013 the Government Accountability Office published a report which concluded that "repealing or amending the Jones Act cabotage law might cut Puerto Rico shipping costs" and that "shippers believed that opening the trade to non-U.S.-flag competition could lower costs". The same GAO report also found that "[shippers] doing business in Puerto Rico that GAO contacted reported that the freight rates are often—although not always—lower for foreign carriers going to and from Puerto Rico and foreign locations than the rates shippers pay to ship similar cargo to and from the United States, despite longer distances. Data were not available to allow us to validate the examples given or verify the extent to which this difference occurred." Ultimately, the report concluded that "[the] effects of modifying the application of the Jones Act for Puerto Rico are highly uncertain" for both Puerto Rico and the United States, particularly for the U.S. shipping industry and the military preparedness of the United States.

A 2018 study by economists at Boston-based Reeve & Associates and Puerto Rico-based Estudios Tecnicos has concluded that the 1920 Jones Act has no impact on either retail prices or the cost of livings on Puerto Rico. The study found that Puerto Rico received very similar or lower shipping freight rates when compared to neighboring islands, and that the transportation costs have no impact on retail prices on the island. The study was based in part on actual comparison of consumer goods at retail stores in San Juan, Puerto Rico, and Jacksonville, Florida, finding: no significant difference in the prices of either grocery items or durable goods between the two locations.

Education

The first school in Puerto Rico was the Escuela de Gramática (Grammar School). It was established by Bishop Alonso Manso in 1513, in the area where the Cathedral of San Juan was to be constructed. The school was free of charge and the courses taught were Latin language, literature, history, science, art, philosophy and theology.

Education in Puerto Rico is divided in three levels—Primary (elementary school grades 1–6), Secondary (intermediate and high school grades 7–12), and Higher Level (undergraduate and graduate studies). As of 2002, the literacy rate of the Puerto Rican population was 94.1%; by gender, it was 93.9% for males and 94.4% for females. According to the 2000 Census, 60.0% of the population attained a high school degree or higher level of education, and 18.3% has a bachelor's degree or higher.

Instruction at the primary school level is compulsory between the ages of 5 and 18. , there are 1539 public schools and 806 private schools.

The largest and oldest university system is the public University of Puerto Rico (UPR) with 11 campuses. The largest private university systems on the island are the Sistema Universitario Ana G. Mendez which operates the Universidad del Turabo, Metropolitan University and Universidad del Este. Other private universities include the multi-campus Inter American University, the Pontifical Catholic University, Universidad Politécnica de Puerto Rico, and the Universidad del Sagrado Corazón. Puerto Rico has four schools of Medicine and three ABA-approved Law Schools.

Science and Technology

Public health and safety
In 2017, there were 69 hospitals in Puerto Rico.

Reforma de Salud de Puerto Rico (Puerto Rico Health Reform) – locally referred to as La Reforma (The Reform) – is a government-run program which provides medical and health care services to the indigent and impoverished, by means of contracting private health insurance companies, rather than employing government-owned hospitals and emergency centers. The Reform is administered by the Puerto Rico Health Insurance Administration.

Crime

The unincorporated territory has a high firearm homicide rate. The homicide rate of 19.2 per 100,000 inhabitants was significantly higher than any U.S. state in 2014. Most homicide victims are gang members and drug traffickers with about 80% of homicides in Puerto Rico being drug related.

Carjackings happen often in many areas of Puerto Rico. In 1992, the FBI made it a Federal crime and rates decreased per statistics, but as of 2019, the problem continued in municipalities like Guaynabo and others. From 1 January 2019, to 14 March 2019, thirty carjackings had occurred on the island.

Culture

Modern Puerto Rican culture is a unique mix of cultural antecedents: including European (predominantly Spanish, Italian, French, German and Irish), African, and, more recently, some North American and many South Americans. Many Cubans and Dominicans have relocated to the island in the past few decades.

From the Spanish, Puerto Rico received the Spanish language, the Catholic religion and the vast majority of their cultural and moral values and traditions. The United States added English-language influence, the university system and the adoption of some holidays and practices. On 12 March 1903, the University of Puerto Rico was officially founded, branching out from the "Escuela Normal Industrial", a smaller organization that was founded in Fajardo three years earlier.

Much of Puerto Rican culture centers on the influence of music and has been shaped by other cultures combining with local and traditional rhythms. Early in the history of Puerto Rican music, the influences of Spanish and African traditions were most noticeable. The cultural movements across the Caribbean and North America have played a vital role in the more recent musical influences which have reached Puerto Rico.

Puerto Rico has many symbols, but only the Flor de Maga has been made official by the Government of Puerto Rico. Other popular, traditional, or unofficial symbols of Puerto Rico are the reina mora bird, the kapok tree, the coquí frog, the jíbaro, the Taíno Indian, and the carite landmark.

Architecture

The architecture of Puerto Rico demonstrates a broad variety of traditions, styles and national influences accumulated over four centuries of Spanish rule, and a century of American rule. Spanish colonial architecture, Ibero-Islamic, art deco, post-modern, and many other architectural forms are visible throughout the island. From town to town, there are also many regional distinctions.

Old San Juan is one of the two barrios, in addition to Santurce, that made up the municipality of San Juan from 1864 to 1951, at which time the former independent municipality of Río Piedras was annexed. With its abundance of shops, historic places, museums, open air cafés, restaurants, gracious homes, tree-shaded plazas, and its old beauty and architectonical peculiarity, Old San Juan is a main spot for local and internal tourism. The district is also characterized by numerous public plazas and churches including San José Church and the Cathedral of San Juan Bautista, which contains the tomb of the Spanish explorer Juan Ponce de León. It also houses the oldest Catholic school for elementary education in Puerto Rico, the Colegio de Párvulos, built in 1865.

The oldest parts of the district of Old San Juan remain partly enclosed by massive walls. Several defensive structures and notable forts, such as the emblematic Fort San Felipe del Morro, Fort San Cristóbal, and El Palacio de Santa Catalina, also known as La Fortaleza, acted as the primary defenses of the settlement which was subjected to numerous attacks. La Fortaleza continues to serve also as the executive mansion for the governor of Puerto Rico. Many of the historic fortifications are part of San Juan National Historic Site.

During the 1940s, sections of Old San Juan fell into disrepair, and many renovation plans were suggested. There was even a strong push to develop Old San Juan as a "small Manhattan". Strict remodeling codes were implemented to prevent new constructions from affecting the common colonial Spanish architectural themes of the old city. When a project proposal suggested that the old Carmelite Convent in San Juan be demolished to erect a new hotel, the Institute had the building declared as a historic building, and then asked that it be converted to a hotel in a renewed facility. This was what became the Hotel El Convento in Old San Juan. The paradigm to reconstruct and renovate the old city and revitalize it has been followed by other cities in the Americas, particularly Havana, Lima and Cartagena de Indias.

Ponce Creole is an architectural style created in Ponce, Puerto Rico, in the late 19th and early 20th centuries. This style of Puerto Rican buildings is found predominantly in residential homes in Ponce that developed between 1895 and 1920. Ponce Creole architecture borrows heavily from the traditions of the French, the Spaniards, and the Caribbean to create houses that were especially built to withstand the hot and dry climate of the region, and to take advantage of the sun and sea breezes characteristic of the southern Puerto Rico's Caribbean Sea coast. It is a blend of wood and masonry, incorporating architectural elements of other styles, from Classical revival and Spanish Revival to Victorian.

Arts

Puerto Rican art reflects many influences, much from its ethnically diverse background. A form of folk art, called santos evolved from the Catholic Church's use of sculptures to convert indigenous Puerto Ricans to Christianity. Santos depict figures of saints and other religious icons and are made from native wood, clay, and stone. After shaping simple, they are often finished by painting them in vivid colors. Santos vary in size, with the smallest examples around eight inches tall and the largest about twenty inches tall. Traditionally, santos were seen as messengers between the earth and Heaven. As such, they occupied a special place on household altars, where people prayed to them, asked for help, or tried to summon their protection.

Also popular, caretas or vejigantes are masks worn during carnivals. Similar masks signifying evil spirits were used in both Spain and Africa, though for different purposes. The Spanish used their masks to frighten lapsed Christians into returning to the church, while tribal Africans used them as protection from the evil spirits they represented. True to their historic origins, Puerto Rican caretas always bear at least several horns and fangs. While usually constructed of papier-mâché, coconut shells and fine metal screening are sometimes used as well. Red and black were the typical colors for caretas but their palette has expanded to include a wide variety of bright hues and patterns.

Cinema

Cuisine

Puerto Rican cuisine has its roots in the cooking traditions and practices of Europe (Spain), Africa and the native Taínos. In the latter part of the 19th century, the cuisine of Puerto Rico was greatly influenced by the United States in the ingredients used in its preparation. Puerto Rican cuisine has transcended the boundaries of the island, and can be found in several countries outside the archipelago. Basic ingredients include grains and legumes, herbs and spices, starchy tropical tubers, vegetables, meat and poultry, seafood and shellfish, and fruits. Main dishes include mofongo, arroz con gandules, pasteles, alcapurrias and pig roast (or lechón). Beverages include maví and piña colada. Desserts include flan, arroz con dulce (sweet rice pudding), piraguas, brazo gitanos, tembleque, polvorones, and dulce de leche.

Locals call their cuisine cocina criolla. The traditional Puerto Rican cuisine was well established by the end of the 19th century. By 1848 the first restaurant, La Mallorquina, opened in Old San Juan. El Cocinero Puertorriqueño, the island's first cookbook was published in 1849.

From the diet of the Taíno people come many tropical roots and tubers like yautía (taro) and especially Yuca (cassava), from which thin cracker-like casabe bread is made. Ajicito or cachucha pepper, a slightly hot habanero pepper, recao/culantro (spiny leaf), achiote (annatto), peppers, allspice, ají caballero (the hottest pepper native to Puerto Rico), peanuts, guavas, pineapples, jicacos (cocoplum), quenepas (mamoncillo), lerenes (Guinea arrowroot), calabazas (tropical pumpkins), and guanabanas (soursops) are all Taíno foods. The Taínos also grew varieties of beans and some maize/corn, but maize was not as dominant in their cooking as it was for the peoples living on the mainland of Mesoamerica. This is due to the frequent hurricanes that Puerto Rico experiences, which destroy crops of maize, leaving more safeguarded plants like conucos (hills of yuca grown together).

Spanish / European influence is also seen in Puerto Rican cuisine. Wheat, chickpeas, capers, olives, onions, garlic, rice, cilantro, oregano, basil, sugarcane, citrus, eggplant, chicken, salted cod, beef, pork, lamb, dairy and a variety of other fruits, herbs and spices all came to Puerto Rico from Spain. The tradition of cooking complex stews and rice dishes in pots such as rice and beans are also thought to be originally European (much like Italians, Spaniards, and the British). Early Dutch, French, Italian, and Chinese immigrants influenced not only the culture but Puerto Rican cooking as well. This great variety of traditions came together to form La Cocina Criolla.

Coconuts, coffee (brought by the Arabs and Corsos to Yauco from Kafa, Ethiopia), okra, yams, orégano brujo, sesame seeds, gandules (pigeon peas in English), bananas, plantains, Guinea hen,
other root vegetables and fruit, all come to Puerto Rico from Africa.

Literature

Puerto Rican literature evolved from the art of oral story telling to its present-day status. Written works by the native islanders of Puerto Rico were prohibited and repressed by the Spanish colonial government. Only those who were commissioned by the Spanish Crown to document the chronological history of the island were allowed to write.

Diego de Torres Vargas was allowed to circumvent this strict prohibition for three reasons: he was a priest, he came from a prosperous Spanish family, and his father was a Sergeant Major in the Spanish Army, who died while defending Puerto Rico from an invasion by the Dutch armada. In 1647, Torres Vargas wrote  ("Description of the Island and City of Puerto Rico"). This historical book was the first to make a detailed geographic description of the island.

The book described all the fruits and commercial establishments of the time, mostly centered in the towns of San Juan and Ponce. The book also listed and described every mine, church, and hospital in the island at the time. The book contained notices on the State and Capital, plus an extensive and erudite bibliography.  was the first successful attempt at writing a comprehensive history of Puerto Rico.

Some of Puerto Rico's earliest writers were influenced by the teachings of Rafael Cordero. Among these was Dr. Manuel A. Alonso, the first Puerto Rican writer of notable importance. In 1849 he published , a collection of verses whose main themes were the poor Puerto Rican country farmer. Eugenio María de Hostos wrote  in 1863, which used Bartolomé de las Casas as a spring board to reflect on Caribbean identity. After this first novel, Hostos abandoned fiction in favor of the essay which he saw as offering greater possibilities for inspiring social change.

In the late 19th century, with the arrival of the first printing press and the founding of the Royal Academy of Belles Letters, Puerto Rican literature began to flourish. The first writers to express their political views in regard to Spanish colonial rule of the island were journalists. After the United States invaded Puerto Rico during the Spanish–American War and the island was ceded to the Americans as a condition of the Treaty of Paris of 1898, writers and poets began to express their opposition to the new colonial rule by writing about patriotic themes.

Alejandro Tapia y Rivera, also known as the Father of Puerto Rican Literature, ushered in a new age of historiography with the publication of The Historical Library of Puerto Rico. Cayetano Coll y Toste was another Puerto Rican historian and writer. His work The Indo-Antillano Vocabulary is valuable in understanding the way the Taínos lived. Manuel Zeno Gandía in 1894 wrote  and told about the harsh life in the remote and mountainous coffee regions in Puerto Rico. Antonio S. Pedreira, described in his work  the cultural survival of the Puerto Rican identity after the American invasion.

With the Puerto Rican diaspora of the 1940s, Puerto Rican literature was greatly influenced by a phenomenon known as the Nuyorican Movement. Puerto Rican literature continued to flourish and many Puerto Ricans have since distinguished themselves as authors, journalists, poets, novelists, playwrights, essayists, and screenwriters. The influence of Puerto Rican literature has transcended the boundaries of the island to the United States and the rest of the world. Over the past fifty years, significant writers include Ed Vega (Omaha Bigelow), Miguel Piñero (Short Eyes), Piri Thomas (Down These Mean Streets), Giannina Braschi (Yo-Yo Boing!), Rosario Ferrer (Eccentric Neighborhoods). and Esmeralda Santiago (When I was Puerto Rican).

Folklore
In her poem The Messenger-Bird, Felicia Hemans refers to a Puerto Rican legend concerning The Fountain of Youth, supposedly to be found in the Lucayan Archipelago. She sourced this from Robertson's History of America. Some books that talk about folklore/myths in Puerto Rico are Stories from Puerto Rico written by Robert L. Muckley and Adela Martínez-Santiago and Cuentos: An Anthology of Short Stories from Puerto Rico written by Kal Wagenheim.

Media

The mass media in Puerto Rico includes local radio stations, television stations and newspapers, the majority of which are conducted in Spanish. There are also three stations of the U.S. Armed Forces Radio and Television Service.

Several television channels provide local content in the island. These include WIPR-TV, Univision affiliate WLII-DT, WAPA-TV, and WKAQ-TV.

Music

The music of Puerto Rico has evolved as a heterogeneous and dynamic product of diverse cultural resources. The most conspicuous musical sources have been Spain and West Africa, although many aspects of Puerto Rican music reflect origins elsewhere in Europe and the Caribbean and, over the last century, from the U.S. Puerto Rican music culture today comprises a wide and rich variety of genres, ranging from indigenous genres like bomba, plena, aguinaldo, danza and salsa to recent hybrids like reggaeton.

Puerto Rico has some national instruments, like the cuatro (Spanish for "four"). The cuatro is a local instrument that was made by the "Jibaro" or people from the mountains. Originally, the Cuatro consisted of four steel strings, hence its name, but currently the Cuatro consists of five double steel strings. It is easily confused with a guitar, even by locals. When held upright, from right to left, the strings are G, D, A, E, B.

In the realm of classical music, the island hosts two main orchestras, the Orquesta Sinfónica de Puerto Rico and the Orquesta Filarmónica de Puerto Rico. The Casals Festival takes place annually in San Juan, drawing in classical musicians from around the world.

With respect to opera, the legendary Puerto Rican tenor Antonio Paoli was so celebrated, that he performed private recitals for Pope Pius X and Tsar Nicholas II of Russia. In 1907, Paoli was the first operatic artist in world history to record an entire opera – when he participated in a performance of Pagliacci by Ruggiero Leoncavallo in Milan, Italy.

Philately

Puerto Rico has been commemorated on four U.S. postal stamps and four personalities have been featured. Insular Territories were commemorated in 1937, the third stamp honored Puerto Rico featuring 'La Fortaleza', the Spanish Governor's Palace. The first free election for governor of the U.S. territory of Puerto Rico was honored on 27 April 1949, at San Juan, Puerto Rico. 'Inauguration' on the 3-cent stamp refers to the election of Luis Muñoz Marín, the first democratically elected governor of Puerto Rico. San Juan, Puerto Rico was commemorated with an 8-cent stamp on its 450th anniversary issued 12 September 1971, featuring a sentry box from Castillo San Felipe del Morro. In the "Flags of our nation series" 2008–2012, of the fifty-five, five territorial flags were featured. Forever stamps included the Puerto Rico Flag illustrated by a bird issued 2011.

Four Puerto Rican personalities have been featured on U.S. postage stamps. These include Roberto Clemente in 1984 as an individual and in the Legends of Baseball series issued in 2000. Luis Muñoz Marín in the Great Americans series, on 18 February 1990, Julia de Burgos in the Literary Arts series, issued 2010, and José Ferrer in the Distinguished American series, issued 2012.

Sports

Baseball was one of the first sports to gain widespread popularity in Puerto Rico. The Puerto Rico Baseball League serves as the only active professional league, operating as a winter league. No Major League Baseball franchise or affiliate plays in Puerto Rico; however, San Juan hosted the Montreal Expos for several series in 2003 and 2004 before they moved to Washington, D.C. and became the Washington Nationals.

The Puerto Rico national baseball team has participated in the World Cup of Baseball winning one gold (1951), four silver and four bronze medals, the Caribbean Series (winning fourteen times) and the World Baseball Classic. On , San Juan's Hiram Bithorn Stadium hosted the opening round as well as the second round of the newly formed World Baseball Classic. Puerto Rican baseball players include Hall of Famers Roberto Clemente, Orlando Cepeda and Roberto Alomar, enshrined in 1973, 1999, and 2011 respectively.

Boxing, basketball, and volleyball are considered popular sports as well. Wilfredo Gómez and McWilliams Arroyo have won their respective divisions at the World Amateur Boxing Championships. Other medalists include José Pedraza, who holds a silver medal, and three boxers who finished in third place, José Luis Vellón, Nelson Dieppa and McJoe Arroyo. In the professional circuit, Puerto Rico has the third-most boxing world champions and it is the global leader in champions per capita. These include Miguel Cotto, Félix Trinidad, Wilfred Benítez and Gómez among others.

The Puerto Rico national basketball team joined the International Basketball Federation in 1957. Since then, it has won more than 30 medals in international competitions, including gold in three FIBA Americas Championships and the 1994 Goodwill Games 8 August 2004, became a landmark date for the team when it became the first team to defeat the United States in an Olympic tournament since the integration of National Basketball Association players. Winning the inaugural game with scores of 92–73 as part of the 2004 Summer Olympics organized in Athens, Greece. Baloncesto Superior Nacional acts as the top-level professional basketball league in Puerto Rico, and has experienced success since its beginning in 1930.

Puerto Rico is also a member of FIFA and CONCACAF. In 2008, the archipelago's first unified league, the Puerto Rico Soccer League, was established.

Other sports include professional wrestling and road running. The World Wrestling Council and International Wrestling Association are the largest wrestling promotions in the main island. The World's Best 10K, held annually in San Juan, has been ranked among the 20 most competitive races globally. The "Puerto Rico All Stars" team, which has won twelve world championships in unicycle basketball.

Organized Streetball has gathered some exposition, with teams like "Puerto Rico Street Ball" competing against established organizations including the Capitanes de Arecibo and AND1's Mixtape Tour Team. Six years after the first visit, AND1 returned as part of their renamed Live Tour, losing to the Puerto Rico Streetballers. Consequently, practitioners of this style have earned participation in international teams, including Orlando "El Gato" Meléndez, who became the first Puerto Rican born athlete to play for the Harlem Globetrotters. Orlando Antigua, whose mother is Puerto Rican, in 1995 became the first Latino and the first non-black in 52 years to play for the Harlem Globetrotters.

Puerto Rico has representation in all international competitions including the Summer and Winter Olympics, the Pan American Games, the Caribbean World Series, and the Central American and Caribbean Games. Puerto Rico hosted the Pan Am Games in 1979 (officially in San Juan), and The Central American and Caribbean Games were hosted in 1993 in Ponce and in 2010 in Mayagüez.

Puerto Rican athletes have won ten medals in Olympic competition (two gold, two silver, six bronze), the first one in 1948 by boxer Juan Evangelista Venegas. Monica Puig won the first gold medal for Puerto Rico in the Olympic Games by winning the Women's Tennis singles title in Rio 2016.

Infrastructure

Transportation 

Cities and towns in Puerto Rico are interconnected by a system of roads, freeways, expressways, and highways maintained by the Highways and Transportation Authority under the jurisdiction of the U.S. Department of Transportation, and patrolled by the Puerto Rico Police Department. The island's metropolitan area is served by a public bus transit system and a metro system called Tren Urbano (in English: Urban Train). Other forms of public transportation include seaborne ferries (that serve Puerto Rico's archipelago) as well as Carros Públicos (private mini buses).

Puerto Rico has three international airports, the Luis Muñoz Marín International Airport in Carolina, Mercedita Airport in Ponce, and the Rafael Hernández Airport in Aguadilla, and 27 local airports. The Luis Muñoz Marín International Airport is the largest aerial transportation hub in the Caribbean.

Puerto Rico has nine ports in different cities across the main island. The San Juan Port is the largest in Puerto Rico, and the busiest port in the Caribbean and the 10th busiest in the United States in terms of commercial activity and cargo movement, respectively. The second largest port is the Port of the Americas in Ponce, currently under expansion to increase cargo capacity to  twenty-foot containers (TEUs) per year.

Utilities

Electricity 
The Puerto Rico Electric Power Authority (PREPA)—Spanish: Autoridad de Energía Eléctrica (AEE)—is an electric power company and the government-owned corporation of Puerto Rico responsible for electricity generation, power transmission, and power distribution in Puerto Rico. PREPA was, by law, the only entity authorized to conduct such business in Puerto Rico, effectively making it a government monopoly until 2018. The Authority is ruled by a governing board appointed by the governor with the advice and consent of the Senate of Puerto Rico, and is run by an executive director.

On 20 July 2018, Puerto Rico Law 120-2018 (Ley para Transformar el Sistema Eléctrico de Puerto Rico) was signed. This law authorized PREPA to sell infrastructure and services to other providers. As a result, a contract was signed on 22 June 2020, making LUMA Energy the new operator of the energy distribution and transmission infrastructure, as well as other areas of PREPA's operations, in effect partially privatizing the Puerto Rican power grid. The takeover was set for 1 June 2021, amidst protests and uncertainty from the point of view of the general public and the former-PREPA workers and union members.

Water and Sewage 
Similarly, the Puerto Rico Aqueducts and Sewers Authority (PRASA) —Spanish: Autoridad de Acueductos y Alcantarillados (AAA)—is a water company and the government-owned corporation responsible for water quality, management, and supply in Puerto Rico. It is the only entity authorized to conduct such business in Puerto Rico, effectively making it a government monopoly. Its existence is designated by Law No. 40 of 1 May 1945, including the corresponding amendments.

Telecommunications 
Telecommunications in Puerto Rico includes radio, television, fixed and mobile telephones, and the Internet. Broadcasting in Puerto Rico is regulated by the U.S. Federal Communications Commission (FCC). , there were 30 TV stations, 125 radio stations and roughly 1 million TV sets on the island. Cable TV subscription services are available and the U.S. Armed Forces Radio and Television Service also broadcast on the island. Puerto Rico also has its own amateur radio prefixes, which differ from those of the contiguous United States in that there are two letter before the number. The most well-known prefix is KP4, but others separated for use on the archipelago (including Desecheo and Mona) are: KP3/KP4/NP3/NP4/WP3/WP4 (Puerto Rico, Vieques and Culebra) and KP5/NP5/WP5 (Desecheo Island). Amateur radio operators (also known as ham radio operators) are a well-known group in the island and can obtain special vehicle license plates with their callsign on them. They have been a key element in disaster relief.

See also
 Index of Puerto Rico-related articles
 Outline of Puerto Rico
 List of Puerto Rican scientists and inventors

Footnotes

Notes

References

Further reading
 Isar P. Godreau, Scripts of Blackness: Race, Cultural nationalism, and U.S. Colonialism in Puerto Rico. Urbana, IL: University of Illinois Press, 2015.

External links

  
 
 
 Department Of Economic Development and Commerce
 
 
 
 
 Puerto Rico. The World Factbook. Central Intelligence Agency.

Geography

United States government

United Nations (U.N.) Declaration on Puerto Rico
 

 
Caribbean islands of the United States
Island countries
Dependent territories in the Caribbean
Greater Antilles
Former colonies in North America
Former Spanish colonies
Insular areas of the United States

New Spain
Spanish Caribbean
Spanish colonization of the Americas
Spanish-speaking countries and territories
Spanish West Indies
States and territories established in 1898
Articles containing video clips
1493 establishments in the Spanish West Indies
1898 disestablishments in the Spanish West Indies
Small Island Developing States